In Canada, a premier is the head of government of a province or territory. Though the word is merely a synonym for prime minister, it is employed for provincial prime ministers to differentiate them from the prime minister of Canada. There are currently ten provincial premiers and three territorial premiers. These persons are styled The Honourable only while in office, unless they are admitted to the King's Privy Council for Canada, in which case they retain the title even after leaving the premiership.

Name

In a number of provinces, premiers were previously known by the title prime minister, with premier being an informal term used to apply to all prime ministers, even the prime minister of Canada. This practice was eventually phased out to avoid confusing the provincial leaders with the federal prime minister, as well as to indicate the distinct nature of the provincial offices. Officially, the last such case outside Quebec was that of W. A. C. Bennett, who served as premier of British Columbia and styled himself as prime minister until leaving office in 1972. The title premier is typically not granted by written law. The formal name of the government position held by the premier is president of the Executive Council or some similar term, but that formal term is rarely used.

The French language does not make a distinction between premier, prime minister and first minister, which are all rendered as "". Thus, "The prime minister of Canada and the premier of Ontario" will be translated as "".

The terms prime minister and premier come from the United Kingdom, where there is only one prime minister / premier. Prime ministers of constituent countries in the UK are titled first minister. Collectively, Canada's federal prime minister and the premiers are collectively referred to as first ministers, another synonym of British origin.

Role

Under Canada's system of responsible government, the premier is both a member of the provincial legislative assembly and the head of the executive. The premier normally holds a seat in the legislative assembly, being elected in one of the electoral constituencies of the province. The leader of the party which commands a majority in the assembly is then legally appointed the premier by the lieutenant governor, representing the Canadian monarch in right of the province. While most often the leader of the largest party in the provincial legislature is invited to become premier, this is not always the case, the most recent occurring after the 2021 general election in Yukon.

Premiers advise the lieutenant governor on whom to appoint to the cabinet and they guide legislation through the legislature. Premiers thus exercise a significant amount of power within the Canadian federation, especially in regard to the federal government. In many ways they remain the most effective representatives of provincial interests to the federal government, as parliament's strong party discipline and other factors have impaired provincial representation there. This reality is acknowledged in annual "first ministers conferences" in which the federal prime minister and the 10 premiers meet to discuss provincial-federal relations. The Meech Lake Accord proposed that these meetings be constitutionally mandated, and some premiers have even proposed that these meetings become a formal branch of government, active in the legislative process (see Council of the Federation). However, only one Canadian provincial premier has ever gone on to serve as prime minister: John Thompson. Canada's first and sixth prime ministers (John A. Macdonald and Charles Tupper) had also been co-premier and premier of British provinces that became part of Canada, but no one who has led a victorious general election campaign in a Canadian province has ever been prime minister.

Canada's three territories have premiers as well, though they are technically known as "government leaders". The premier of Yukon is chosen in the usual fashion, but the premiers of Nunavut and Northwest Territories are selected from within the small and non-partisan elected territorial councils.

Current premiers

Timeline

See also
 Premiers of the Australian states
 Governor (United States) (the head of government in the states of the United States)
 Deputy Premier (Canada)

References

Government in Canada
Canadian first ministers
Provincial and territorial ministers in Canada